Neil Genzlinger is an American playwright, editor, book reviewer, and theatre and television critic who frequently writes for The New York Times.

Family
Genzlinger is a grandson of the late The Philadelphia Bulletin columnist Don Rose. He has two daughters: Abby, who has Rett syndrome, and Emily. Abby has appeared in Julia Roberts' documentary "Silent Angels." Emily is a law student and recipient of the prestigious Gideon's Promise fellowship for aspiring public defenders.

Career
Genzlinger began working for the Times as a television critic in 2011. Prior to that, he was an editor there. His reviews tend to shift more toward theater and television related to disabilities, such as plays called Syndrome, Autism: The Musical and Push Girls."

Seinfeld disagreement
In one review, Genzlinger criticized TV writers for what he perceived as their overuse of the word "really". He claimed that it's "delivered with a high-pitched sneer to indicate a contempt so complete that it requires no clarification" and, "it’s undoing 2,000 years’ worth of human progress." In response, comedian Jerry Seinfeld wrote an angry letter to Genzlinger, wherein he responded "Really, Neil? Really? You’re upset about too many people saying, 'Really?'? I mean, really... OK, fine, when it’s used in scripted media, it is a little lazy. But comedy writers are lazy. You’re not fixing that. So, here’s the bottom line. If you’re a writer, fine, don’t use it. But in conversation it is fun to say." Seinfeld went on to mock Genzlinger's use of the commonly-encountered phrase "wrap my head around it," laboriously dissecting the image on the basis that "There’s no 'wrapping.' There’s no heads going around". This protest from Seinfeld was due to the fact that, as he mentioned in the letter, he had previously performed 'a "Saturday Night Live Weekend Update" segment titled "Really!?!" with Seth Meyers" which Seinfeld stated "was a blast and the audience loved it." Some outlets reporting on the fracas, including Yahoo, considered Seinfeld "really has a lot of free time on his hands" for having gone to the extent of taking Genzlinger to task over being "not amused" by the column. Julie Miller, for Vanity Fair, observed Seinfeld was motivated by having been "one of the most successful perpetrators of the term" criticized by Genzlinger, and concluded by wondering "what other polarizing topics might inspire Jerry Seinfeld to immediately write a personal letter to a journalist". Erik Hayden, for Time, observed that Genzlinger's original opinion piece "seems like an argument that could have been taken as a decent point made", but saw Seinfeld's point "If you’re a writer, fine, don’t use it. But in conversation it is fun to say." CNN's Maane Khatchatourian noted Seinfeld was "really ticked off", but called the letter "amusingly outraged", noting the timely publication of Seinfeld's "keen observation" just prior to his "five-borough New York City comedy tour".

References

Year of birth missing (living people)
Living people
American dramatists and playwrights
American theater critics
Critics employed by The New York Times
Place of birth missing (living people)